Delimitation Act, 2002 is a law of India.

Amendments
The Election Laws (Amendment) Bill, 2016, introduced by Law Minister D. V. Sadananda Gowda, seeks to amend Section 11 of the Delimitation Act, 2002. Once passed, the proposed Bill will enable the Election Commission to carry out a limited delimitation of assembly and parliamentary constituencies in Cooch Behar district of West Bengal following the exchange of 51 Bangladeshi and 111 Indian enclaves in July 2015. The enclaves were exchanged pursuant to the 1974 Land Boundary Agreement and 2011 Protocol and Instruments of Ratification during Prime Minister Narendra Modi's visit to Bangladesh on 6–7 June 2015.

References

Law of India
Constituencies in India